UFO: Alien Invasion is a strategy video game in which the player fights aliens that are trying to take control of the Earth. The game is heavily influenced by the X-COM series, especially X-COM: UFO Defense.

It is based on a modified id Tech 2 engine, and runs on Linux, FreeBSD, OpenBSD, Microsoft Windows, AmigaOS 4, and Mac OS X for both PowerPC and Intel Macs. There is also a version for Android, published on Android Market.

Gameplay 

The game takes inspiration from the X-COM series by Mythos Games and MicroProse. However, it is neither a sequel nor a remake of any X-COM or other commercial title:  "What we as a team wanted to make is a brand new experience that tries to surpass the quality of games from 1992, rather than simply recreate them with flashier graphics." UFO: Alien Invasion is a squad-based tactical strategy game in the tradition of the classic X-COM series of games (the player controls a secret organization charged with defending Earth from a brutal alien enemy). The game aims to combine military realism with hard science-fiction and the weirdness of an alien invasion and the turn-based system is supposed to give the player pin-point control of the squad while maintaining a sense of pace and danger.

Like the original X-COM games, UFO:AI has two main modes of play: Geoscape mode and Tactical (also known as Battlescape) mode.

Geoscape mode 
Geoscape mode deals with base management and strategy. The player directs the activities and finances of PHALANX, controlling bases, installations, aircraft and squads of armed-response troops. Once researched, new technologies may be used in battle against the aliens. Interceptor aircraft can be launched to shoot down UFOs and dispatch dropships in response to alien activity across the globe. The player can build, buy and produce anything available, as long as technology level and budget will allow it. Geoscape mode employs easy-to-use time buttons to control the passage of time, automatically pausing whenever there's an important message. Research will progress and items will be produced as time passes. The player can build additional facilities (provided they have enough base space) and hire employees (provided they have enough living space) to increase the speed of production, research, or to replace soldiers lost in combat. All items in the game, ranging from weaponry to alien building materials take up space and need storage facilities. The player receives money from supporting countries (based on effectiveness at dealing with aliens in their area) monthly, but the majority of the money comes from selling loot like alien weaponry or materials collected from successful tactical missions.

Tactical mode 
In Tactical mode, the player takes command of a team of soldiers in various missions to combat the aliens wherever they might appear. Instead of pushing impersonal armies around on giant maps, the players uses only the team of soldiers assigned to deal with this mission (as of 2.5, the maximum number of player-controlled actors is 12). Tactical mode uses a turn-based system, where the human team and the aliens take turns to make moves. During the player's turn the troops can be ordered to move around, fire their weapons, throw grenades or use other equipment. Each soldier gets a certain number of Time Units (TUs), representing the total time they have to act during the current turn.  All actions in Tactical mode require Time Units to perform and once a soldier is out of Time Units, the soldier cannot do anything more until the next turn. Both aliens and humans can reserve TUs for reaction fire, however, and if the actor sees an enemy perform actions with equal or greater TU cost, during their turn, they will fire. Therefore, soldiers armed with pistols, and other weapons with low TU costs are often able to get the first shot on an enemy armed with a heavier and deadlier weapon. There are many tiers of weapons, such as explosives, projectiles, lasers, plasma, particle beams, and EM guns, each with their strengths and weaknesses (examples being the high accuracy of lasers, but relatively low damage output, or the high damage of particle beams, but low rates of fire and high recoil). Unlike X-COM and many similar games, there is no one "super weapon" that the player rushes to and then arms every single soldier with as soon as they can but should rather keep a healthy, balanced arsenal to be effective at different ranges and amounts of cover. Civilians and other bystanders may be found during the mission, either being targeted by the aliens, or just getting in the way while the troops try to protect them. Saving the game is impossible in tactical mode, though you can retry the mission at any time.

Development 

UFO: Alien Invasion''' is based on a heavily modified Quake II engine
This engine is free software, licensed under the GNU General Public License. Development is coordinated through SourceForge.net, and the first version was released on 30 December 2003.

Since end of 2012 UFO:AI's artwork is only licensed under various open source/open content licenses (mostly CC BY-SA 3.0 and public domain), which makes the game fully free and open source software and Debian's DFSG compliant, which allows the inclusion into Linux distributions.

As of June 2018, version 2.5 is the latest stable version (released June 28, 2014), while unstable versions are released regularly.

The official website has not released any new update since April 2018.

 Reception UFO:AI was nominated for "Best project for Gamers" in the SourceForge 2007 and 2008 Community Choice Awards. In 2008 APCMag.com named UFO: Alien Invasion among the Top 5 best (free) open source games. Linux Game News named it the Best Open Source Game in the Turn-Based category in September 2012 and it was positively noted by Linux Journal. Between 2006 and May 2017 UFO:AI'' was downloaded from Sourceforge over 1.7 million times.

References

External links 

 

2003 video games
Alien invasions in video games
AmigaOS 4 games
Creative Commons-licensed video games
Fangames
Free software programmed in C
Free software programmed in C++
Linux games
Lua (programming language)-scripted video games
Classic Mac OS games
MorphOS games
Multiplayer online games
Open-source video games
Real-time strategy video games
Strategy video games
Science fiction video games
Tactical role-playing video games
Turn-based tactics video games
Video games about extraterrestrial life
Windows games